The 2004 Multan bombing was a car bombing that took place in Multan, Punjab, Pakistan on October 7, 2004. The death toll was reported at 41 and the number of injured was close to 100.

Day of the attack 
Top leaders of the banned outfit Sipah-e-Sahaba Pakistan along with Ahl-i-Sunnat-Wal Jamaat had organized a meeting to mourn the death of  Amjad Hussain Farooqi. The meeting began on 10:30 pm on Wednesday after Isha prayers, and it ran till 4:15 am on Thursday morning. The bomb blast took place as the people were leaving the meeting venue at Rashidabad neighbourhood.

Incident
Ahl-i-Sunnat-Wal Jamaat had gathered a crowd of 2000 for a meeting when the attack happened around 4:30 am. The bomb, according to Interior Minister Aftab Khan Sherpao was remote-controlled and was placed inside of a Suzuki car. Eyewitnesses reported that they heard two blasts with a 20-second interval. Besides killing innocent civilians the bomb also damaged some nearby buildings and left puddles of blood and human flesh scattered around. Two minutes after the first explosion, another blast went off. According to reports this bomb was attached to a motorcycle.

Aftermath

After the attack the Pakistani police were deployed to the site amid the attacks from protestors who burned tires, damaged windscreens, and attacked two ambulances. The blast left a one and half foot crater at ground zero. After the blast most of shops in the area closed down and people from started gathering to protest. Some of them pelleted passing vehicles with stones and chanted slogans against the government for failure to provide security to its citizens.

Later on the police arrested Irfan Ali Shah who was eventually found guilty on 40 counts of terrorism for masterminding the double bombing and was sentenced to death in 2006.

References

2004 murders in Pakistan
2000s crimes in Punjab, Pakistan
2000s trials
2004 bombing
21st-century mass murder in Pakistan
Attacks on buildings and structures in 2004
Attacks on buildings and structures in Punjab, Pakistan
Car and truck bombings in Pakistan
2004 bombing
Improvised explosive device bombings in 2004
Improvised explosive device bombings in Punjab, Pakistan
Mass murder in 2004
Mass murder in Punjab, Pakistan
Massacres in Pakistan
Murder trials
October 2004 crimes
October 2004 events in Pakistan
Terrorist incidents in Pakistan in 2004
Trials in Pakistan